One Cebu (1-CEBU) is a provincial political party based in the province of Cebu. It is headed by Gwendolyn Garcia, governor of Cebu.

History 
The party was formed in response to the Sugbuak, or the failed Cebu-split movement, in time for the 2007 general elections. A brainchild of three Cebuano representatives who were in their last terms of office, Sugbuak entailed the supposed splitting of Cebu province into four independent provinces.

In founding One Cebu, the Garcia family and their supporters capitalized on the widespread opposition to the Sugbuak movement, declaring that there is only one Cebu; hence, the party's name. They later left the Lakas—Christian Muslim Democrats, once the dominant majority party in national politics, and joined former President Gloria Macapagal Arroyo's political party, the Kabalikat ng Malayang Pilipino (KAMPI). The party's strength was further bolstered by internal alliances with the Alayon Alang sa Kalambuan ug Kalinaw (Alayon) party in the first district, led by the Gullas family, and the Barug Alang sa Kauswagan ug Demokrasya (BAKUD) party of the Durano family in the fifth district. This led to Governor Gwendolyn Garcia's wide margin — around half a million votes — in the votes cast for governor in the 2007 elections.

A year after Benigno Aquino III was elected President of the Philippines in 2010, One Cebu again switched party allegiance— this time, to the National Unity Party, whom former Cebu governor Pablo Garcia founded. In 2016, the party formed a local coalition together with the United Nationalist Alliance (UNA). One Cebu broke ties with UNA in March 2016, and instead supported Davao City Mayor Rodrigo Duterte's presidential campaign.

Representation in the Congress 
As of the last elections for the House of Representatives, One Cebu holds 7 out of 277 seats. Cebu's six congressional districts and the newly created district of Lapu-Lapu City are currently represented by the following members of One Cebu:
Rep. Rhea Mae Gullas (1st District)
Rep. Atty. Pablo John F. Garcia (3rd District)
Rep. Janice Z. Salimbangon (4th District)
Rep. Vincent Franco D. Frasco (5th District)
Rep. Daphne A. Lagon (6th District)
Rep. Emmarie M. Ouano-Dizon (Lone District of Mandaue City)

One Cebu also dominates the provincial council with Gov. Garcia and Vice Governor candidate Daphne Salimbangon leading a large majority of Sangguniang Panlalawigan members, plus the presidents of the local Liga ng mga Barangay, Sangguniang Kabataan and the Councilors' League. In the local level, the party has the backing of 31 out of 53 city and municipal mayors throughout Cebu.

Electoral history

2010 National and Local Elections 
In the 2010 national elections, One Cebu strongly campaigned for the candidacy of Gilbert "Gibo" Teodoro, Jr., the standard bearer of the now-merged Lakas-Kampi-CMD party. Gov. Garcia promised that Cebu will give 1 million votes to Teodoro, but local election results showed the latter behind then presumptive president-elect Aquino who got more than 400,000 votes.

Gov. Garcia selected businessman Glenn Anthony Soco to be her running mate in the 2010 elections. Gov. Garcia and Soco are said to have a 'romantic relationship,' which created much media hype.

The vice gubernatorial hopeful, however, still lost to the late former vice governor Gregorio Sanchez, Jr., who is the founding vice president of One Cebu. Sanchez later bolted out of Gov. Garcia's group after One Cebu welcomed Tuburan, Cebu mayor Constancio Suezo and his team as party members. The former vice governor was against the inclusion of Suezo's group after they allegedly failed to maintain the peace and order situation in the town.

2013 Local Elections 
In 2010, Rep. Pablo John Garcia, the governor's brother, announced that he and Soco will be One Cebu’s candidates for governor and vice governor, respectively, in the 2013 local elections.  But in May 2011, Pablo John said he decided not to run for governor because he wants to continue serving his home district.

2016 National Elections 
The party joint-forces with the United Nationalist Alliance party of Vice President Jejomar Binay to form a local coalition for the 2016 national elections. The coalition was launched on February 16, 2016 at the Waterfront Cebu City Hotel & Casino. One Cebu later withdrew support for Binay and his party UNA on March 21, 2016.

On April 2, 2016, One Cebu has announced that they will support the presidential candidacy of Davao City Mayor Rodrigo Duterte. The party has pledged to deliver more than 1 million votes for the Visayan candidate. The alliance between One Cebu and Duterte was launched on April 21, 2016.

Winston Garcia, a former Provincial Board Member and former chairman of (GSIS) during the Arroyo administration was fielded for the gubernatorial post in the province with Nerissa Corazon Soon-Ruiz, former Sixth District congresswoman, running for the vice gubernatorial post. Garcia and Soon-Ruiz were defeated by incumbent Governor Hilario Davide III and Vice Governor Agnes Magpale.

2022 elections 
After several months, Gwen Garcia officially endorsed the tandem of Bongbong Marcos and Sara Duterte for upcoming 2022 presidential elections. The endorsement of Marcos and Duterte caused Pablo John "PJ" Garcia (one of the political supporters of Isko Moreno's presidential campaign) to step down as secretary-general of the party, but PJ Garcia one said that he will still support and campaign for all of the 1-Cebu candidates (especially on their district).

Electoral performance

References

Conservative parties in the Philippines
Philippines
Local political parties in the Philippines
Politics of Cebu